Ricardo Eugene Goltz (born March 19, 1955 in Vancouver, British Columbia, Canada) is a former gridiron NFL and CFL player.

He played his college football at Simon Fraser University in Burnaby, British Columbia. In 1978, he was drafted by his hometown B.C. Lions with the 3rd overall pick in the CFL draft. During the 1987 NFL strike, he was signed as a replacement player by the Los Angeles Raiders.

External links 
NFL stats

1955 births
Living people
American football defensive linemen
Canadian football defensive linemen
Players of Canadian football from British Columbia
Los Angeles Raiders players
BC Lions players
Calgary Stampeders players
Saskatchewan Roughriders players
Sportspeople from Vancouver
Canadian football people from Vancouver
Simon Fraser Clan football players
Canadian players of American football
Gridiron football people from British Columbia